Lopha marshii is a fossil species of true oyster, a marine bivalve mollusc in the family Ostreidae, the true oysters. This species was present in the Bajocian age (about 170 mya).

References
 Biolib
Paleobiology Database
Sepkoski, Jack Sepkoski's Online Genus Database

Ostreidae
Molluscs described in 1914